Antonio (Nery) Juarbe Pol Airport  is a public use airport located  southeast of Arecibo, Puerto Rico. It is owned by the Puerto Rico Ports Authority. This airport is included in the National Plan of Integrated Airport Systems for 2011–2015, which categorized it as a general aviation airport.

The IATA and FAA airport codes differ because IATA had already assigned the "ABO" code to Aboisso Airport in Côte d'Ivoire.

History

World War II 
During World War II, the airport was used by the United States Army Air Forces Sixth Air Force conducting antisubmarine patrols. It was known as Arecibo Field. Flying units using the airfield were:
 32d Fighter Squadron (36th Fighter Group) 11 December 1941 – 19 February 1942; 19 February – 9 March 1942 (P-36 Hawk)
 23rd Fighter Squadron (36th Fighter Group), 11 March – 16 May 1943 (P-39 Airacobra)

Name 
The airport was named after a prominent Arecibo-born businessman and pilot, who perished along with his wife and two passengers, on a flight from Isla Grande airport in San Juan to Arecibo on Mother's day, 1979. His wife's body was recovered the next day being picked up by fishermen from La Perla in San Juan. His body, the two other passengers, and the aircraft (a Cessna) were recovered from the sea on Father's day 1979. They were visiting his parents in San Juan for Mother's day. The weather was particularly rough that evening and is believed to be the cause of the accident.

Facilities and aircraft 
Antonio Nery Juarbe Pol Airport covers an area of 178 acres (72 ha) at an elevation of 23 feet (7 m) above mean sea level. It has one runway designated 8/26 with an asphalt surface measuring 3,975 by 60 feet (1,212 × 18 m).

Antonio (Nery) Juarbe Pol Airport has a large number of light-sport aircraft and ultralights. It has become the main center of Sport Aviation in Puerto Rico. The airport is very popular with skydiving community, with a private skydiving school located there.

See also 
 Transport in Puerto Rico
 List of airports in Puerto Rico

References

External links 
 
 SkyVector - Antonio/Nery/Juarbe Pol Airport

Airports in Puerto Rico
Buildings and structures in Arecibo, Puerto Rico
Airfields of the United States Army Air Forces
Closed military facilities in Puerto Rico